A number of people claim to have eidetic memory, but science has never found a single verifiable case of photographic memory. Eidetic imagery is virtually nonexistent in adults. Most people showing amazing memory abilities use mnemonic strategies, mostly the method of loci. This includes all winners of the annual World Memory Championships and most of the known scientific cases of excellent memories, like Solomon Shereshevsky. Regardless, the following list contains people who have claimed photographic memory.

People claimed to possess an eidetic memory
Charles Nalder Baeyertz, a publisher and music critic in New Zealand. His capacity to memorize a page at a glance enabled him to display an apparently inexhaustible supply of knowledge and to acquire several languages. He claimed to have learnt Maori by memorizing a dictionary. His favourite party trick was to read a newspaper column then recite it backward.
Winnie Bamara, whose ability to paint scenes accurately and solely from memory attracted wide attention in the 1950s.
David Boies, an American litigator, is frequently described as having a photographic memory that enables him to recite exact text, page numbers, and legal exhibits. Colleagues attribute his courtroom success in part to this ability.
C. S. Lewis, a scholar and theologian widely acclaimed to be "the best read man of his generation, one who read and remembers everything he read." In his mid-teens, Lewis was reading classical and contemporary works in Latin, Greek, Italian, French, and German. Indeed, Lewis seemed to remember most of what he had read. One notable story from his student is someone could quote any line from Milton's epic Paradise Lost, and Lewis would continue the rest of the line from memory. Another student stated that he could take any book from Lewis' shelf, open a page at random to read, and Lewis could summarize the rest of the page.
 The Darawiish reciter Huseen Dhiqle could memorize upwards of a hundred poems of the Sayid's each of them hundreds of lines long after hearing them once.
 The mathematician Leonhard Euler has been characterized as having an eidetic memory.   He was able to, for example, repeat the Aeneid of Virgil from beginning to end without hesitation, and for every page in the edition he could indicate which line was the first and which was the last even decades after having read it.
 Robert Evans can identify new objects that appear in starfields of 1,500 galaxies.
 Akira Haraguchi holds the unofficial world record for the most decimal places of pi recited by memory. His ability is self-attributed to a strong eidetic memory, though he uses a mnemonic device.
The astronomer Johannes Kepler had a photographic memory according to Rolf Keppler, a descendant of Kepler's brother Christoph.
Klaus Kinski, a German actor, was described by Will Tremper as having a photographic memory, which allowed him to memorize a book page within minutes.
Chaitanya Mahaprabhu, is described in his biography as a "shruti-dhara", or "someone who could memorize anything immediately".
Dimitri Mitropoulos Greek, American conductor was noted for having an eidetic memory which enabled him to conduct without a score, even during rehearsals 
Said Nursî, an Ottoman Islamic scholar who was able to recite many books from memory. For instance "... So then he [Molla Fethullah] decided to test his memory and handed him a copy of the work by Al-Hariri of Basra (1054–1122) — also famous for his intelligence and power of memory — called Maqamat al-Hariri. Said read one page once, memorized it, then repeated it by heart. Molla Fethullah expressed his amazement."
 "Shas Pollak" (Yiddish: Talmud-Pole), Jewish term for any mnemonist who memorized the exact layout of words in more than 5,422 pages of the 12 books of the standard edition of the Babylonian Talmud. However, the claim to eidetic memory was later disputed.
 Nigel Richards, New Zealand scrabble player who, despite not speaking French, won the French World Scrabble Championships twice by studying the French dictionary for 9 weeks, is said to possess an eidetic memory.
Abubakar Shekau, the leader of the Nigerian Islamist militant group Boko Haram, has been described as possessing a photographic memory.
Sukarno, the father of Indonesian independence and the first president of the Republic of Indonesia, is said to have had a photographic memory, which helped him in his language learning.
 Nikola Tesla also is claimed to have possessed photographic memory.
Arturo Toscanini, an Italian conductor. It was estimated that by the end of his career he had memorized over 200 symphonies and up to 100 operas. "One of his second grade school teachers, Signora Vernoni, noticed that Toscanini could memorize poems after a single reading and could pick out on the piano the songs and arias he had heard people singing."
 Leonardo da Vinci is said to have possessed photographic memory.
 Swami Vivekananda is believed to have eidetic memory as he could memorize a book just by going through it for a single time.
 The mathematician John von Neumann was able to memorize a column of the phone book at a single glance. Herman Goldstine wrote about him: "One of his remarkable abilities was his power of absolute recall. As far as I could tell, von Neumann was able on once reading a book or article to quote it back verbatim; moreover, he could do it years later without hesitation." 
Stephen Wiltshire is a prodigious savant, capable of drawing the entire skyline of a city after a helicopter ride.

See also
 Exceptional memory – about the scientific background of research on exceptional memory
 Hyperthymesia, ability to remember specific details of virtually every day of one's life since childhood

References

Eidetic memory